Arifin Bey (5 March 1925 – 2 September 2010) was born in Padang Panjang, West Sumatra in the Minangkabau Highlands, one year before the Communist revolt in 1926, and three years before the participants of Youth Conference in 1928 avowed themselves to be one people, the Indonesian people, constituting one nation, Indonesia, with one language Bahasa Indonesia. They were years of growing political and social unrest during which Dutch rule became increasingly oppressive.

Early life
He was one of eight siblings, five girls and three boys. His father was a school inspector in the Dutch administration. Among friends and colleagues, he was known as Buyung, thus his Dutch colleagues referred to him as Mijnheer Bij,-Mr.B. Bij was Indonesianised to Bey, and adopted as the family name of his children. Arifin was highly intelligent, and qualified for entry into the Dutch educational stream. It was said of him that he was never without a book. He kept up with world events, and assembled files of newspaper clippings. He was politically engaged, and a member of the Young Sumatra Association. At the age of 16, his public speaking activities had him investigated by the police, his father interrogated, their home searched, and his newspaper clippings confiscated. The headmaster of the Dutch school he attended recognised his ability saved him from any further escalation of punishment, and arranged for him to continue teacher-training studies in Bandung.

The Japanese Occupation in 1942 interrupted his formal education. But he studied privately, despite the chaos, and began the study of Japanese that was to become the foundation of his future career. He was selected by the Japanese to study in Japan as a potential leader in Indonesia when the war was won. Ironically, Tokyo was thought to be too dangerous for his cohort of Indonesian and other students from Southeast Asia, and they were sent to study at the Hiroshima University of Arts and Sciences. Hiroshima up to that time had not been heavily bombed.

He went to Japan as a scholarship student during the Pacific War, when Indonesia was under Japanese occupation, and found himself in Hiroshima in 1945, when the city was hit by an atomic bomb. Of the five hundred students in the university lecture theatre when the bomb exploded, only he and a Thai student survived.  Physically he was not severely injured, but later developed radiation sickness. He remained in Japan for some time, and by chance at a railway station, saw a Japanese woman hassled by some American soldiers. He extricated her from the melee, to her great relief. His Japanese by then was so fluent that at first she thought he was Japanese. Discovering he was an Indonesian, she took him home to meet her parents and siblings.  Two of her brothers were doctors, and recognising he was suffering from radiation sickness, arranged hospital treatment for him. The family virtually adopted him, and shared in caring for him, this twenty-year-old, far from home. Later he was to marry the Japanese woman he had helped. It was a long and happy marriage, until she died of cancer.

His knowledge of English, gained at the Dutch school, his mastery of Japanese, and his outstanding general ability and social skills led him to the  Department of Foreign Affairs when he returned to Indonesia. He was sent to America, and in 1954 was the first Indonesia to serve in a staff appointment at the United Nations in New York City. He continued to study, gaining a Bachelor’s and then a master's degree at a New York University. He returned to Indonesia, and after serving for two years as assistant to the Director of the Indonesian Institute of the Sciences, was sponsored by the Ford Foundation for a Ph.D at Georgetown University. In 1961, he completed his studies at Georgetown University, earning a Ph.D. in international political science through a dissertation on dialogue in search of consensus in the Indonesian political process.

Activities
On returning to Indonesia, he was appointed editor of the semi-official English language daily, Indonesian Herald. He was the editor from 1961 to 1967. During the years of Guided Democracy amid the increasing tensions leading to the attempted coup in 1965, it was an exposed position. Skilful ideological navigation was necessary to avoid disaster. He survived, though later it was rumoured he had compromised his integrity.

He was assigned as a councillor to the Indonesian Embassy in Tokyo in 1967. This presented a new challenge. He had then been away from Japan for 17 years, but it was a position for which he was uniquely qualified by his knowledge of Japanese, his personal experience of a cataclysmic event in Japanese history, his work in the United Nations, his academic achievements, and his work in journalism. It was the gateway to a field that he would make his own. He realised that the only way into the world of Japanese thinking and acting was through the Japanese language, and he devoted himself to deepening his knowledge of it. None of the other members of the Indonesian Embassy staff at that time knew Japanese well, and so for knowledge of Japanese affairs were dependent on information filtered through English language press. This was inadequate, so he prepared every morning a digest of Japanese news from the Japanese media for distribution to his colleagues.

He founded an Association of Japanese speaking diplomats. It met for lunch monthly, invited Japanese guests to give lectures in Japanese, and for the length of the meeting, only Japanese was spoken. The speakers included opinion leaders, but not all was high seriousness.  One was a clairvoyant was responsibility was to advise business executives on what business deals to enter and what to avoid, and what names to give to products, even cars, so that they would sell. A highlight in this period was acting as interpreter for President Suharto on his state visit to Japan in 1968 when he addressed the Foreign Correspondents Club.

This experience, the knowledge, competence and confidence he gained in speaking and writing Japanese, and his people skills, were to wean him from the world of diplomacy into that of academe. He was invited to give radio talks and appear on television programs, thanks to which he became widely known as Bey San. He received invitations to give seminars, and to teach at the Area Studies Program at Tsukuba University, where he was required to lecture in both Japanese and English. In doing so, he had a key role in developing Southeast Asian Studies in Japan as a Southeast Asian fluent in Japanese.

He returned to Jakarta in 1970. But despite the quality of his work in Japan, rumours that he had sailed too close to the wind in his editorship of the Indonesian Herald persisted. Gestapu-ism at that time hung in the air much as Macarthy-ism in America a decade earlier.  Thus it was felt expedient to loan him to the think tank Research Documentation and Analysis (REDA) an Indonesian military-supported research organization, to report from Tokyo. The Director, Zulkifli Lubis, who had in fact been imprisoned by Sukarno, decided to appoint a resident correspondent in Tokyo, and chose Arifin.  The then Foreign Minister Adam Malik granted him ‘extended leave without pay’, and he left again for Japan. A new stage in his life had begun. He was on the road to a new career. And it was now that the key words in the title of his Ph.D. thesis for Georgetown, Dialogue and Consensus, concepts which had had so central a place in his mind and thinking, began to bear fruit. In addition to his work as ‘Foreign Correspondent’ he was in demand at Japanese Universities.

Between 1972 – 74, he served as a Visiting Lecturer at Sophia University and the International Christian University, teaching courses on Western Political Thought and Intercultural Communication respectively. In 1976 he was appointed as Visiting Professor at Tsukuba University, a position which he held until 1984. The Iranian Islamic revolution in 1979, transformed his position and his role. The Japanese were flabbergasted, but did not take too seriously the statement attributed to Kissinger, that the evolution would only last six weeks. Arifin was at the time one of the very few scholars of Islamic faith in Japan who could lecture on Islam as a religion and culture in Japanese. And he was inundated with invitations to write articles or give talks on Islam. Alongside his courses on Modern Japanese Politics Domestic and International, he developed introductory courses on Islam, and on the Religions and Cultures of Southeast Asia.

In 1984, he received a commendation from the Japanese Ministry for Foreign Affairs for ‘Meritorious Services in Culture and Information’.  In the same year he resigned from Tsukuba University in 1984, planning to use his unique knowledge and experience of Japan to develop Japanese Studies at tertiary  institutions in Indonesia. First he spent a year the Bung Hatta University in Padang. While there, the Japanese Ambassador came to Padang to confer on him the Japanese Foreign Ministry’s award ‘for distinguished service in the field of public information and cultural understanding’. In 1985, he moved to the Universitas Nasional Jakarta, to found The Japan Research Centre, which he directed until 1987. But somehow things do not work out as hoped. Japan called again, and he was appointed Visiting Professor at Kanda University of International Studies in Chiba, where he taught until 1995. In 1991, he was presented the Japanese Imperial Medal of The Order of Sacred Treasure, Gold Rays and Neck Ribbon. This was an award from the Emperor, rarely awarded to foreigners.

Part of the citation is as follows:

… during your more than twenty years’ stay in Japan, you have shown a deep understanding of this country and its people …As an international political scientist who understands our culture and our way of thinking, you are uniquely positioned among Indonesian intellectuals. …You have served as a kind of moral compass for Japanese diplomacy towards Asia, and for Japanese comprehension of fellow Asian peoples.  You have contributed to the promotion of mutual understanding between Japan and Indonesia and to the spread of international political studies in Japan.

At the age of 70, in 1995, he decided to return home, to Indonesia. But by way of a detour was appointed for a three-year term to a position as Visiting Professor at the University of Malaya, teaching the History of Japanese Thought and the Making of Modern Japan. Only in 1998 did he make his home again in Jakarta. There he devoted his energies to a different level of the educational spectrum. With his daughter Mulyati Bey, he established an Islamic kindergarten, Taman Kanak-Kanak Islam Arif Mulya in the Jakarta suburb of Bukit Modern. It is an institution that is highly regarded, and continues to thrive. In the year 2000, on his 75th birthday, he added the final touch to his career by performing the Hajj with his daughter.

He wrote widely and copiously, although most of his publications are in Japanese. He did however in 2002 publish a book of collected essays, Beyond Civilizational Dialogue, in part autobiographical, part reflective on global issues of politics and culture, in part on the role of Islam in society. The late Professor Nurcholish Madjid wrote a preface. It has many vivid anecdotes. One is of the pains of studying Japanese; another is of Hatta being offered pork at New York state luncheon; yet another is of the American Visiting American Professor in 1955 who urged him to write a Ph.D thesis on the side Indonesia should take in the Cold War. He replied that the ideologies of Democracy and Communism were not his concern.  He was more concerned with issues of personal and national identity. The Professor replied, ‘The whole American mission is to implant democracy in the four corners of the world. Even if you do not want it, we will push it down your throat for your own good’. But Arifin, in his father’s foot-steps stood by his convictions. He wrote on Dialogue and Consensus.

Back in Indonesia, he remained active, administering the Kindergarten, lecturing, writing, reading widely, and above all fulfilling with love and care all his responsibilities as head of his large extended family, whether in Jakarta or Padang. He was the very model of a Minangkabau Mamak. He did not forget his family in Australia, nor they him, and they were represented at his eightieth birthday five years ago. He was a person of total dedication: to his Islamic Faith, to his ideals as an educationalist in the widest sense of the word, and to the family that was always a central part of his life.

Publications
(English)
 Bey, H. Arifin. (2003), Beyond civilizational dialogue : a multicultural symbiosis in the service of world politics, Published by Paramadina in cooperation with The Japan Foundation, Jakarta

(Indonesian)
 Bey, Arifin (1990), Peranan Jepang dalam pasca "Abad Amerika": Serangkai Bunga Rampai, Published by Antakarya
 Arifin, Bey. & Roni, Abubakar Masyhur Jusuf, (1975), Bey Arifin contra Jusuf Roni [mukadimmah oleh] Umar Hubeis, Pustaka Progressif, Surabaya.
 Bey, Arifin (1986), Kesetiakawanan Sosial, Sejarah dan Cara Menghayatinya, Published by Bina Ilmu
 Bey, Arifin (1968), Samudera Al-Fatihah 
 Bey, Arifin (1963), Rangkaian Tjerita Dalam Al-Qurʼan, Published by Alma'arif
 Bey, Arifin (1953), Dari Sun Yat Sen ke Mao Tze-tung, Published by Tintamas

References

External links
 http://www2.kokugakuin.ac.jp/ijcc/wp/cimac/bey.html

1925 births
2010 deaths
Georgetown University alumni
Academic staff of the University of Tsukuba
Minangkabau people
People from Padang Panjang